Anna Wang Roe (born 1961) is an American neuroscientist, the director of the Interdisciplinary Institute of Neuroscience and Technology (ZIINT), and full-time professor at the Zhejiang University, Hangzhou, China. She is known for her studies on the functional organization and connectivity of  cerebral cortex and for bringing interdisciplinary approaches to address questions in systems neuroscience.

Career
Anna Wang Roe obtained her B.A. cum laude from Harvard University in 1984, majoring in biochemistry with special field of interest in neurobiology. Further, she was awarded Ph.D. in Neuroscience from MIT in 1991, under the supervision of Mriganka Sur. During her doctoral studies, she developed an experimental paradigm known as the 'rewired ferret' for studying the development and plasticity of the brain. After obtaining Ph.D., she went on to undertake post-doctoral training with Dr. Torsten Wiesel and Dr. Daniel Y Ts'o at Baylor College of Medicine (1993–1995), where she studied the functional organization of the primary and secondary visual cortical areas of the primate brain using Intrinsic Signal Optical Imaging. In 1996, as a visiting scholar at University of Queensland in Brisbane, Australia, she studied the visual system of marmosets and flying foxes.

Roe returned to the United States in 1996 where she started her first faculty position as an assistant professor (tenure track) in the Department of Neurobiology at the Yale School of Medicine. Her laboratory moved to Vanderbilt University in 2003, where she worked as a professor Psychology, Radiology, and Biomedical Engineering until 2015. At Vanderbilt, her research was primarily on the visual and somatosensory system of primates. From 2016 to 2020, Roe was appointed as a professor of Neuroscience at the Oregon National Primate Research Center at the Oregon Health & Science University.

In 2013, Roe founded the 'Interdisciplinary Institute for Neuroscience and Technology (ZIINT)' at the Zhejiang University, which focuses on fundamental research in the fields of cognitive and behavioral neuroscience, and neurotechnology. She is the founding director of ZIINT, and of Zhejiang University-Siemens Joint Brain Imaging Research Center, and she also holds a professorship in the Zhejiang University School of Medicine and Department of Biomedical Engineering.

Roe also serves as the associate editor of scientific journals like Neurophotonics, NeuroImage, Trends in Neuroscience and Frontiers in Integrative Neuroscience. She has previously held memberships in the SMI and IFCN of the NIH study sections and regularly conducts grant reviews for funding agencies in the US, Europe, Israel, and China.  She also holds advisory roles for research and faculty development in the US and China.

Awards and honours
2018 & 2020:   Gordon Research Conference Organizer   
2018: Zhejiang Optical Society Council Member 
2017: International Neuropsychological Symposium Member 
2017: Elected Senior Member of SPIE 
2016: ISMRM Plenary Speaker 
2015: AAAS Fellow 
1998–2003: David and Lucile Packard Foundation Fellowship
1997–1999: Alfred P. Sloan Research Fellowship
1996–1999: Whitehall Foundation Research Fellowship

Selected publications

Roe AW, Chen G, Xu AG, Hu JM (2020) A roadmap to a columnar visual cortical prosthetic. Curr Opin Physiol, 16:68–78.
Xu AG, Qian M, Tian F, Xu B, Friedman RM, Wang J, Song X, Sun Y, Chernov MM, Cayce JM, Jansen ED, Mahadevan-Jansen A, Zhang XT, Chen G, Roe AW (2019) Focal infrared neural stimulation with high-field functional MRI: a rapid way to map mesoscale brain connections. Science Advances, 5(4)
Roe AW (2019) Columnar connectome: towards a mathematics of brain function. Network Neuroscience 3(3):779-791. April 22, 2019.
Chernov M, Friedman RM, Chen G, Roe AW (2018) Functionally specific optogenetic modulation in primate visual cortex. Proc Natl Acad Sci.  115(41):10505-10510.
Chen G, Lu HD, Tanigawa H, Roe AW (2017) Solving visual correspondence between the two eyes via domain-based population encoding in nonhuman primates. Proc Natl Acad Sci, 114(49):13024-13029.
Wang Z, Negyessy L, Chen LM, Friedman RM, John Gore, Roe AW (2013) The relationship of anatomical and functional connectivity to resting state connectivity in primate somatosensory cortex. Neuron, 78(6):1116-26.
Tanigawa H, Lu HD, Roe AW (2010) Functional organization for color and orientation in macaque V4. Nature Neurosci, 13(12):1542-8. 
Lu HD, Chen GC, Tanigawa H, Roe AW (2010) A motion direction map in Macaque V2, Neuron, 68(5):1002-1013
Lu HD, Roe AW (2008) Functional organization of color domains in V1 and V2 of Macaque monkey revealed by optical imaging. Cerebral Cortex, 18(3):516-33.
Friedman, RM; Chen, LM; Roe, AW. "Modality maps within primate somatosensory cortex". Proceedings of the National Academy of Sciences of the United States of America. 101 (34): 12724–9, 2004. 
Chen LM, Friedman RM, Roe AW (2003) Optical imaging of a tactile illusion in Area 3b of primary somatosensory cortex.  Science 302:881-885. 
Roe AW, Ts'o DY (1995) Visual topography in primate V2:  multiple representation across functional stripes.  J Neurosci 15:3689-3715.
Roe, AW; Pallas, SL; Kwon, YH; Sur, M (1992). "Visual projections routed to the auditory pathway in ferrets: receptive fields of visual neurons in primary auditory cortex". Journal of neuroscience. 12 (9): 3651–64. 
Roe, A.W., S.L. Pallas, J.O. Hahm, and M. Sur (1990).  A map of visual space induced in primary auditory cortex. Science 250: 818–820, 1990.
 Pallas, SL; Roe, AW; Sur, M. "Visual projections induced into the auditory pathway of ferrets. I. Novel inputs to primary auditory cortex (AI) from the LP/pulvinar complex and the topography of the MGN-AI projection". The Journal of comparative neurology. 298 (1): 50–68. 
Sur, M., P.E. Garraghty, and A.W. Roe (1988). Experimentally induced visual projections into auditory thalamus and cortex. Science 242: 1437–1441.

See also
Women in science

References 

Living people
1961 births
Oregon Health & Science University faculty
Vanderbilt University faculty
Yale School of Medicine faculty
Massachusetts Institute of Technology alumni
Harvard College alumni